Wilfrido Radamés Vargas Martínez (born April 24, 1949 in Altamira, Puerto Plata, Dominican Republic) is a band leader, trumpeter, vocalist, arranger, composer and producer who was instrumental in making the merengue style a worldwide phenomenon.

He was surrounded by musical influences; namely, his father Ramón, an accordionist and guitarist, and his mother Bienvenida, a flute player and guitarist. Vargas began his musical studies early, attending the Municipal Academy of Music beginning at age 10.

He has been a trumpeter and a vocalist, but has also arranged, composed, and led his band, and is also a producer.

Career

1970s
He began his career with the band Wilfrido Vargas y sus Beduinos by recording his first album in 1972.

Alongside many Latin music super stars, he performed during the 1979 music festival Havana Jam.

1980s

Wilfrido appeared in the 1989 film .

1990s
He was nominated in 1991 for the 33rd Grammy Awards in the Best Tropical Latin Performance for his album Animation. In 1993, he was decorated by the Dominican president Joaquín Balaguer with the Order of Christopher Columbus in the Knight grade, alongside fellow Dominican musicians Jorge Taveras, Manuel Tejada and Julio Gautreaux for their contribution to the development and dissemination of the national music.

The song  from his 1983 album  was the basis for the 1991 hit single,  by Cuban-American rapper DJ Laz.

For the telenovela Bellísima, Wilfrido performed the theme song,  and also performed the song  for the 1997 film Out to Sea.

2000s
In 2003 he acted in the drama film.

Vargas participated in 2007 at the Colombian version of The X Factor, as the groups mentor.

As of 2010, he lives in Colombia.

Discography

Grammy Nomination
 Best Tropical Latin Performance – Animation (1990)

Filmography

References 

20th-century Dominican Republic male singers
Dominican Republic songwriters
Male songwriters
Dominican Republic composers
Merengue musicians
Latin music record producers
Latin music songwriters
Latin Grammy Lifetime Achievement Award winners
Knights of the Order of Christopher Columbus
1949 births
Living people
21st-century Dominican Republic male singers